Boulevard is a 1960 French film directed by Julien Duvivier and set in the Quartier Pigalle.

Plot 
Georges "Jojo" Castagnier is an adolescent who lives in a poor room under the roof of a block of apartments in the Pigalle section of Paris. He ran away from home when he realized that his stepmother hates him. Among Jojo's many neighbors is the object of his affection, gorgeous nightclub dancer Jenny Dorr. But, to Jojo's disappointment, Jenny becomes the lover of former boxer Dicky, who spends his time loafing about the Pigalle cafés.

Jojo lacks for steady work, but manages to meet his financial obligations with a series of odd jobs. He tries selling magazines, which is a success for a while, and posing for artists, which proves to be a disaster. Eventually, he woos his neighbor Marietta, a girl more suited to his age. But when things go awry, Jojo becomes desperate and tries to commit suicide by jumping off the roof of his building.

Cast
 Jean-Pierre Léaud as Georges Castagnier, 'Jojo'
 Magali Noël as Jenny Dorr
 Pierre Mondy as Dicky
 Monique Brienne as Marietta
 Georges Adet as monsieur Arthur
 Jacques Duby as Giuseppe Amato, a painter
 Jean-Marie Amato as a tramp
 Mag-Avril as the old woman, Josephine
 Detty Beckers as a dancer
 Robert Dalban as a fairground worker

External links
 

French drama films
Films directed by Julien Duvivier
1960 films
1960 LGBT-related films
1960s French-language films
1960s French films
French LGBT-related films
LGBT-related drama films